Taplin is an unincorporated community and coal town in Logan County, West Virginia, United States. Taplin had a post office, which closed on March 7, 1998.

References

Unincorporated communities in Logan County, West Virginia
Unincorporated communities in West Virginia
Coal towns in West Virginia
Populated places on the Guyandotte River